Michal Giacko (born 27 September 1969) is a Slovak skier. He competed in the Nordic combined event at the 1994 Winter Olympics.

References

External links
 

1969 births
Living people
Slovak male Nordic combined skiers
Olympic Nordic combined skiers of Slovakia
Nordic combined skiers at the 1994 Winter Olympics
Sportspeople from Poprad